Vandalia is a city in northeastern Audrain and extending into southeastern Ralls Counties in the U.S. state of Missouri. The population was 3,553 at the 2020 census, which includes about 1,000 prisoners incarcerated at the prison located within the city limits.

The Audrain County portion of Vandalia is part of the Mexico Micropolitan Statistical Area, while the Ralls County portion is part of the Hannibal Micropolitan Statistical Area.

History
Vandalia was laid off by Aaron McPike and Judge Harmen Caldwell in 1870  and platted in 1871. The city was named after Vandalia, Illinois.  Aaron McPike transferred the lumber used to build the first homes from Louisiana, Missouri. A post office called Vandalia has been in operation since 1871.

The Lincoln School was listed on the National Register of Historic Places in 1996.

Geography
Vandalia is located on US Route 54 in the northeastern corner of Audrain County about 15 miles west of Bowling Green.

Vandalia is about 27 miles from the Mississippi River, 30 miles southwest of Hannibal and 100 miles northwest of St. Louis. The Gateway Western Railroad line runs through the town. U.S. Route 54 connects Vandalia with Illinois to the east and Jefferson City and the Lake of the Ozarks to the south and west.

Climate

Demographics

2010 census
As of the census of 2010, there were 3,899 people, 1,105 households, and 671 families living in the city. The racial makeup of the city was 81.4% White, 15.7% African American, 0.4% Native American, 0.4% Asian, 0.3% from other races, and 1.8% from two or more races. Hispanic or Latino of any race were 1.8% of the population.

There were 1,105 households, of which 29.0% had children under the age of 18 living with them, 40.9% were married couples living together, 15.1% had a female householder with no husband present, 4.7% had a male householder with no wife present, and 39.3% were non-families. 34.3% of all households were made up of individuals, and 16.1% had someone living alone who was 65 years of age or older. The average household size was 2.24 and the average family size was 2.82.

The median age in the city was 37 years. 15% of residents were under the age of 18; 10.3% were between the ages of 18 and 24; 38.4% were from 25 to 44; 24% were from 45 to 64; and 12.3% were 65 years of age or older. The gender makeup of the city was 29.5% male and 70.5% female.

2000 census
As of the census of 2000, there were 2,529 people, 1,176 households, and 702 families living in the city. The population density was 1,117.8 people per square mile (432.1/km). There were 1,343 housing units at an average density of 593.6 per square mile (229.4/km). The racial makeup of the city was 86.91% White, 10.76% African American, 0.47% Asian, 0.20% from other races, and 1.66% from two or more races. Hispanic or Latino of any race were 0.79% of the population.

There were 1,176 households, out of which 25.6% had children under the age of 18 living with them, 44.3% were married couples living together, 12.0% had a female householder with no husband present, and 40.3% were non-families. 37.5% of all households were made up of individuals, and 20.2% had someone living alone who was 65 years of age or older. The average household size was 2.15 and the average family size was 2.81.

In the city, the population was spread out, with 23.7% under the age of 18, 7.0% from 18 to 24, 24.1% from 25 to 44, 23.2% from 45 to 64, and 22.0% who were 65 years of age or older. The median age was 42 years. For every 100 females, there were 86.1 males. For every 100 females age 18 and over, there were 84.6 males.

The median income for a household in the city was $25,213, and the median income for a family was $33,819. Males had a median income of $26,356 versus $16,114 for females. The per capita income for the city was $14,859. About 14.6% of families and 18.0% of the population were below the poverty line, including 33.7% of those under age 18 and 6.7% of those age 65 or over.

Government and infrastructure
The Women's Eastern Reception, Diagnostic and Correctional Center, a women's prison of the Missouri Department of Corrections, is located in Vandalia.

The United States Postal Service operates the Vandalia Post Office.

Education
Van-Far R-I School District operates one elementary school, one middle school and Van-Far Jr./Sr. High School.

Vandalia has a lending library, a branch of the Mexico-Audrain Library District.

References

External links
 Historic maps of Vandalia in the Sanborn Maps of Missouri Collection at the University of Missouri

 

Cities in Audrain County, Missouri
Cities in Ralls County, Missouri
Cities in Missouri
Hannibal, Missouri micropolitan area
Populated places established in 1874
1874 establishments in Missouri